Mazhavillu is a 1999 Indian Malayalam-language romantic thriller film directed by Dinesh Baboo. It is a remake of director's own 1997 Kannada movie Amrutha Varshini. It stars Kunchacko Boban, Preeti Jhangiani and Vineeth in the lead roles, with Lalu Alex, Chithra, and Praveena in other pivotal roles.

Plot
Mahesh and Veena are a happily married couple living in Austria with Mahesh working for an amusement park called Prater. One day, Vijay Krishnan, a poet and Mahesh's childhood friend, visits them. Vijay is depressed as his girlfriend Neena died due to cancer. Neena had made Vijay promise that he will marry another girl after her death. Vijay becomes obsessed with Veena as she has a strong resemblance with Neena.  Mahesh learns of this but doesn't reveal this to Veena. Mahesh takes Vijay to a cliff and asks him to change his mind and go back home. Vijay tries to kill Mahesh who slips and dies falling from the cliff. Vijay does not try to save him even though he could have. Mahesh's automatic camera captures the whole episode. When Veena accidentally sees those pictures, she understands what really happened on that day. She pretends to have moved on and suggests that she is ready to share her life with Vijay. She asks him to take her to the cliff where Mahesh died as it was Mahesh's long-cherished dream to take photos from the cliff. She then confronts Vijay and commits suicide from that cliff, in front of Vijay, as revenge.

Cast
Kunchacko Boban as Mahesh Menon
Preeti Jhangiani as Veena Mahesh
Vineeth as Vijay Krishnan 
Lalu Alex as Varkeychan 
Chithra as Kathreena 
Praveena as Neena 
Kottayam Nazeer

Music
The film features a well composed score and soundtrack by Mohan Sitara. The lyrics were penned by Kaithapram Damodaran Namboothiri. The soundtrack of Mazhavillu was well received. "Ponnolathumbi" and "Raavin Nilakkayal" are well received.
"Kilivathil" - K. S. Chithra
"Kilivathil" - K. J. Yesudas
"Ponnolathumbil" - K. S. Chithra, K. J. Yesudas
"Pulliman Kidave" - K. J. Yesudas, K.S.Chithra
"Pulliman Kidave" - Srinivas, K.S. Chithra
"Raavin Nilakkayal" - K. S. Chithra, K. J. Yesudas
"Sivadham" - K. S. Chithra, K. J. Yesudas

References

External links
 
 Mazhavillu

1990s Malayalam-language films
Films scored by Mohan Sithara
1999 romantic drama films
1999 films
Malayalam remakes of Kannada films
Films directed by Dinesh Baboo
Films set in Germany